Nils Krister von Baumgarten (1674, Kalmar ― 1727, Stockholm) was a Swedish military officer.

He served as a "Drabant – King's loyal guard" in the Great Northern War. He participated in the Landing on Humlebæk, the battle of Narva, Duna, Klissow, Pultusk, Thorn, Lemberg, Fraustadt and Stresow where he gave his horse to Charles XII, king of Sweden, after the previous one got shot. Right after he was appointed Colonel of Adelsfanan. He followed Charles to Norway and later, after the Swedish king's death, he stayed away from the military. In total he had fought in eighteen battles and was wounded five times.

Sources
Nils Krister von Baumgarten

1674 births
1727 deaths
People from Kalmar
Swedish military personnel of the Great Northern War
18th-century Swedish military personnel